The Mun River, sometimes spelled Moon River, is a tributary of the Mekong River.

Geography

The river begins in the Khao Yai National Park area of the Sankamphaeng Range, near Nakhon Ratchasima in northeast Thailand. The Mun River's main tributary is the Chi River, which joins it in the Kanthararom District of Sisaket Province.

History
Thanks to the Andy Williams hit song, the Mun River was called "Moon River" by US Air Force personnel stationed at Ubon Ratchathani airbase during the Vietnam War. The spelling is still fairly common.

The controversial Pak Mun Dam, which is charged with causing environmental damage, is near the river's confluence with the Mekong.

Tributaries
Lam Dom Noi
Chi River
Lam Takhong

References

External links

Rivers of Thailand
Tributaries of the Mekong River
Isan
Geography of Nakhon Ratchasima province
Geography of Buriram province
Geography of Surin province
Geography of Sisaket province
Geography of Ubon Ratchathani province